HMS Tartar was a wooden screw corvette of the Royal Navy. Originally built for the Russian Empire, she was seized by British forces on 5 April 1854, shortly before her launch.

History
HMS Tartar was built by W. & H. Pitcher at Northfleet on the river Thames, alongside her sister ship, for the Russians. They were confiscated by the British prior to their completion, and Tartar was launched on 17 May 1854.

She was fitted for British service from 14 December of that same year. From 1854 to 1859, Tartar was in active service throughout the Crimean War, and served on the North America and West Indies Station. During that period, Captain Hugh Dunlop was the captain of HMS Tartar. For her service in the Baltic she was awarded the battle honour Baltic 1855. In 1860 she sailed from Sheerness Dockyard under Captain John Montagu Hayes for service in the Pacific, primarily in Japan. She underwent repairs in South Africa during her voyage to Japan.  HMS Tartar was then involved in the Shimonoseki campaign of 1863-1864 and was involved in the bombardment of Shimonoseki itself.

After the Shimonoseki conflict, the ship remained at Sheerness before being sold to Castle shipbreakers and being broken up at Charlton. She was in commission for a total of five years in Japan and China, and five during the Crimean War.

References

1854 ships
Corvettes of the Royal Navy
Ships built in Northfleet
Crimean War naval ships of the United Kingdom